Rambhajjan Zindabaad (Rise Of Rama Song) or Omprakash Zindabad is a Bollywood fiction film produced by Khalid Kidwai, starring Om Puri in the lead role

Cast
 Om Puri
 Kulbhushan Kharbanda
 Zakir Hussain (actor)
 Ram Sethi
 Jagdeep
 Abhay Joshi
 Seema Azmi
 Khushboo Kamal
 Shweta Bhardwaj
Jay Shanker Pandey

References

Unreleased Hindi-language films